Blue Dream is a 2013 drama film directed by Gregory Hatanaka. It stars James Duval, Dominique Swain, Pollyanna McIntosh, Kayden Kross, Noah Hathaway, and Walter Koenig and Sal Landi.  It premiered at the SF Indiefest and  Gold Coast Film Festival in Australia.

Premise
Robert Harmon is a newspaper journalist in the late 1990s.  As the Internet begins to take over and print circulation declines, he is forced to make a series of unethical and immoral decisions leading to his downfall.

Cast

 James Duval — Robert Harmon
 Dominique Swain — Gena Townsend
 Pollyanna McIntosh — Amanda
 Kayden Kross — Tara
 Noah Hathaway — Roper Karlsson
 Sal Landi — George Weber
 Walter Koenig - Lasse Karlsson
 Richard Riehle - Ted Sellers
 Olivia Barash - Rachel Purviance
 Nicole D'Angelo - Heather/Tatyana
 Stanley B. Herman - Detective Addy
 Elana Krausz - Jo Tynan
 Brian McGuire - Kojira Karlsson
 Barry O'Rourke - Charles
 Paula LaBaredas - Nathalie
 Naoyuki Ikeda - Takahashi
 Bogdan Szumilas - Feng Kwai-Sher

External links

2013 films
2010s exploitation films
American exploitation films
Films shot in Los Angeles
2013 drama films
American drama films
2010s English-language films
Films directed by Gregory Hatanaka
2010s American films